Cricket Association of Pondicherry (CAP) is the governing body for cricket in Puducherry, formerly known as Pondicherry. Puducherry is a Union Territory in India and for the Puducherry cricket team. On 27 October 2017, Supreme Court-appointed Committee of Administrators (CoA) granted Associate Membership of the Board of Control for Cricket in India (BCCI) to the Cricket Association of Puducherry (CAP).  Prior to this, it was affiliated to Tamil Nadu Cricket Association(TNCA) as a District Association. In 2019, CAP was granted full membership of the BCCI.

See also
Board of Cricket Control in India

References

External links

CoA grants Associate membership to Cricket Association of Pondicherry
Cricket Association of Pondicherry News 

Cricket administration in India
Cricket in Puducherry
2003 establishments in Pondicherry
Sports organizations established in 2003